Shararat is a Pakistani Urdu film which was released in early 2003 across theaters in Pakistan.

This movie was Samina Peerzada's sophomore directorial venture, but unlike her hit debut Inteha (1999), it was met with a rather mixed reaction at the theaters. 
The film is a romantic comedy which deals with the story of a Pakistani-American who returns to her native village in Punjab in Pakistan and the subsequent twist and turns in her love life. Moammar Rana starred opposite Mehr Hassan, who made her Lollywood debut with Shararat.

Film music
Film music director Wajahat Attre composed some super-hit film songs which included Raat Jaa Rahee Hai and Jugnu'on Sey Bhar Ley Aanchal, the latter having been sung by the teen sensation Ali Zafar and Shabnam Majeed with film song lyrics by Aqeel Ruby.

Cast
 Reema
 Mehr Hassan
 Moammar Rana
 Shaan (as Jogi)
 Nirma
 Usman Peerzada
 Babar Ali

References

External links 
 

2003 films
2000s Urdu-language films
Pakistani musical drama films
Films set in Lahore
Films scored by Wajahat Attre
Urdu-language Pakistani films